The Genting Poker Series was a major series of regional poker tournaments held across the United Kingdom run by Genting Casinos, a UK based casino chain operated by the Genting Group. The Genting Poker Series was established in 2012, returning for subsequent seasons in 2013, 2014 and 2015.

Tournament results

2012 Series

2013 Series

2014 Series

2015 Series

References

External links
 Genting Poker Series official website
 Genting Poker Series at the Hendon Mob powered by the Global Poker Index

Poker tournaments in Europe